Uus Eesti was a daily newspaper published in Estonia from September 1935 until the Soviet occupation of Estonia in June 1940. The newspaper was politically aligned with the then Estonian government.

History 
The paper was established in September 1935, as the successor to the paper Kaja.

Columnists and regular contributors of Uus Eesti included Johannes Aavik, Paul Öpik, Friedebert Tuglas, Aleksander Tõnisson, Marie Under, August Gailit, Paul Kogerman, Mait Metsanurk, Henrik Visnapuu, and others.

In 1937, the National Archives of Estonia made an agreement with Uus Eesti photographer A. Kalm to share one photograph of each major public event in Estonia, as part of a larger project to preserve photographs from national newspapers.

The Soviets shut the paper down on 21 June 1940. The pro-soviet, socialist paper Rahva Hääl was printed in its place.

References

External links
 Estonian National Library archive

Newspapers published in Estonia